Kozłówka may refer to the following places:
Kozłówka, Lublin Voivodeship (east Poland)
Kozłówka, Podlaskie Voivodeship (north-east Poland)
Kozłówka, Masovian Voivodeship (east-central Poland)